Lyle Francis Schoenfeldt (born 1939) is an American business management professor best known for a standard textbook on human resources.

Schoenfeldt earned his B.A. from Case Western Reserve University, and his M.S. and Ph.D. from Purdue University. He held a position at University of Georgia and was Director of Early Identification of Management Talent (EIMT) at Rensselaer Polytechnic Institute before joining Texas A&M University in 1981, where he was the Marie B. Oth Professor of Business. He remained there until 1996.

In 1994 he was one of 52 signatories on "Mainstream Science on Intelligence," an editorial written by Linda Gottfredson and published in the Wall Street Journal, which declared the consensus of the signing scholars on issues related to the controversy about intelligence research that followed the publication of the book The Bell Curve.

He has been a professor at the Walker College of Business at Appalachian State University since 1996. He won the Cattell Award of the Division of Industrial and Organizational Psychology at the American Psychological Association.

From June 1, 1996, until February 1, 2006, he and his wife Wanda Hinshaw (a North Carolina native) owned the Mast Farm Inn, a preserved 19th century farm in Valle Crucis, North Carolina that has been listed since 1972 in the National Register of Historic Places.

Selected bibliography

Cynthia D. Fisher, Lyle F. Schoenfeldt, James B. Shaw. Human Resource Management. Houghton Mifflin Company (6th ed.)

References

External links
Lyle F. Schoenfeldt web page via ASU

Living people
Rensselaer Polytechnic Institute faculty
Case Western Reserve University alumni
Purdue University College of Health and Human Sciences alumni
1939 births
21st-century American psychologists
People from Valle Crucis, North Carolina
20th-century American psychologists